How Sweet It Is! is a 1968 comedy film starring James Garner and Debbie Reynolds, with a supporting cast including Terry-Thomas and Paul Lynde.

Garner plays a photographer who accompanies his wife and teenage son on an assignment in Paris, with both husband and wife struggling to stay faithful under extreme temptation. The film was written by producers Garry Marshall and Jerry Belson (adapting Muriel Resnik's novel The Girl in the Turqoise Bikini) and directed by Jerry Paris. Jimmy Webb wrote the title song, and Patrick Williams scored the sound track.

Plot

Teenager David Henderson wants to tag along with his girlfriend Gloria and a group of American students touring France. His mother Jenny hates the idea until she manages to get her professional photographer husband Graf to document the group's travels for his company.

Jenny books passage for them all on an ocean liner, and a stay at a Riviera hotel, from Gilbert, a dishonest, shyster travel agent. On the ship, they are dismayed to be assigned bunk beds in separate, crowded rooms with many teenagers, and endure an emergency drill; there is little privacy.

On arrival in Paris, Jenny leaves her husband with the school tour group, traveling alone to the bogus address shown as their Riviera hotel, hundreds of miles away. When she arrives at the luxurious mansion, she acts like she owns the place. She is puzzled to find it is instead a private home owned by a wealthy lawyer, Phillipe Maspere, who is equally puzzled at her arrival.

Jenny is unable to contact the phony travel agent. Nevertheless, Phillipe, who is attracted to her, offers her an extended stay there at a reasonable price with just him and his manservant/ butler.

Phillipe turns out to be a notorious womanizer who tries to seduce Jenny at a wild poolside party, unsuccessfully.

Grif, meanwhile, becomes friendly with an attractive chaperone with the American student group in Paris. When he indirectly learns of his wife Jenny's situation (by seeing a picture in a newspaper), he panics and impulsively drives cross-country alone at night, on a stolen school bus to get her.

When Grif arrives, seeing Jenny in the pool with the Frenchman, he punches him. Storming off in the bus she follows on the back of the butler's tricycle. She catches up with Grif but, as they head back to the tour group's hotel, they are stopped by Italian patrolmen, since the bus was reported stolen.

Jenny is placed in a jail cell with prostitutes, who are then all bailed out by their pimp and taken to a very fine hotel. Jenny is shocked to see her son at the brothel. The family is eventually reunited and they return home.

Cast
 James Garner as "Grif"
 Debbie Reynolds as Jenny
 Maurice Ronet as Phillipe
 Alexandra Hay as Gloria
 Terry-Thomas as Gilbert
 Paul Lynde as the Purser
 Donald Losby as Davey
 Hilary Thompson as "Bootsie"
 Marcel Dalio as Louis
 Gino Conforti as Agatzi
 Vito Scotti as The Chef
 Don Diamond as The Bartender
 Penny Marshall as School Girl
 Erin Moran as Little Girl At Phone Booth
 Walter Brooke as Haskell
 Elena Verdugo as Vera
 Ann Morgan Guilbert as Bibi

Production and release
How Sweet It Is! was the first production for National General Pictures. The title is taken from a television catchphrase popularized in the 1950s by comedian Jackie Gleason.

Garner wrote in his memoirs that he "loved Debbie Reynolds. Loved Paul Lynde. Loved Terry Thomas. Hated the movie."

Upon its release in August 1968, the film received a mixed response with critics and audiences. According to Howard Thompson of The New York Times, "This tired, aimlessly frisky comedy ... is about as sweet as a dill pickle."

See also
List of American films of 1968

References

External links
 
 
 

1968 films
1960s sex comedy films
American sex comedy films
1960s English-language films
Films scored by Patrick Williams
Films based on American novels
Films set in Paris
Films with screenplays by Jerry Belson
Films directed by Jerry Paris
1968 comedy films
1960s American films